Burnt Factory is an unincorporated community in Morgan County, West Virginia north of Berkeley Springs. It is located along Sand Mine Road (West Virginia Secondary Route 38/1) off Hancock Road (U.S. Route 522) and is the site of the U.S. Silica Company's Berkeley Springs plant. U.S. Silica is a producer of ground and unground silica sand, kaolin clay, and aplite. These materials are extracted from Warm Spring Ridge directly across U.S. Route 522 from the facility in Burnt Factory.

References 

Unincorporated communities in Morgan County, West Virginia
Unincorporated communities in West Virginia
Sand mining